Bahram Beyzai (1938) has directed one television play and fourteen stage plays, including a double-bill.

Table

References
 Rubin, Don; Pong, Chua Soo; Chaturvedi, Ravi; Majumdar, Ramendu; Tanokura, Minoru; Brisbane, Katherine, eds. (2001). The World Encyclopedia of Contemporary Theatre. Asia/Pacific. London: Routledge. ISBN 978-0-415-26087-9.
 بیضایی، بهرام. «سالشمار زندگی و آثار بهرام بیضایی.» سیمیا. 2. 2008.

Bahram Beyzai
Theatre-related lists